Frederique van Arkel (born 7 January 2000) is a Dutch cricketer. In August 2019, she was named in the Dutch Women's Twenty20 International (WT20I) squad for the 2019 Netherlands Women's Quadrangular Series. She made her WT20I debut for the Netherlands, against Ireland, on 8 August 2019.

References

External links
 

2000 births
Living people
Dutch women cricketers
Netherlands women Twenty20 International cricketers
Place of birth missing (living people)
21st-century Dutch women